50 is the seventh studio album by English singer and songwriter Rick Astley. It was released on 10 June 2016 by BMG. It is Astley's first studio album in more than 10 years, following Portrait (2005).  In the United Kingdom, 50 became Astley's first number-one album since his 1987 debut album Whenever You Need Somebody. All songs on this album were sung, written and recorded by Astley himself. The album was later released on 7 October 2016 in the United States, marking his first American release since 1993's Body & Soul. The album was made as a commencement to Astley's 50th birthday in 2016, hence the album's title.

Singles
"Keep Singing" was released as the lead single from the album on 6 April 2016. "Angels on My Side" was released as the second single from the album on 13 May 2016. Astley announced a new limited single called "Dance" (which includes the song "God Says") on 19 July 2016.

Commercial performance
50 debuted at number one on the UK Albums Chart, selling 23,691 units in its opening week. It was Astley's first number-one album in the United Kingdom since Whenever You Need Somebody (1987). In Germany, the album debuted at number 42 on the German Albums Chart, becoming his highest-charting album since Free (1991) which charted at number eight. On 8 July 2016, the album was certified Silver for sales of 60,000 copies from BPI. On 30 June 2017, Astley announced on his Twitter account that 50 had been certified Platinum in the United Kingdom (300,000 and more albums sold).

Track listing

Personnel 
 Rick Astley – lead and backing vocals, all instruments 
 Dawn Joseph – backing vocals (1, 2, 4-7, 9, 10, 11)
 Annabel Williams – backing vocals (1, 10)
 Emilie Bausager Astley, Lene Bausager Astley, Georgia Frampton, Jacqui Hughes and Kevin Hughes – choir (9)

Production 
 Rick Astley – producer 
 Dan Frampton – vocal producer, engineer, mixing 
 Tom Coyne – mastering 
 We Art You – art direction, design 
 Peter Neill – photography 
 Pip – photography
 Recorded and Mixed at The Grey Room (Hollywood, California).
 Mastered at Sterling Sound (New York City, New York).

Charts and certifications

Weekly charts

Year-end charts

Certifications

References

External links
Official Website

2016 albums
Rick Astley albums